The chain pickerel (Esox niger) is a species of freshwater fish in the pike family (family Esocidae) of order Esociformes. The chain pickerel and the American pickerel (E. americanus) belong to the Esox genus of pike.

Taxonomy
French naturalist Charles Alexandre Lesueur described the chain pickerel in 1818. Its species name is the Latin word niger "black".

Nicknames include the "southern pike", "grass pike", "jack", "jackfish", "gunny" and "eastern pickerel". In central Florida the chain pickerel is known locally as "Gatorfish"

Description
The chain pickerel has a distinctive, dark, chain-like pattern on its greenish sides. There is a vertical dark marking underneath the eye, which helps to distinguish the chain pickerel from redfin pickerel (Esox americanus americanus) and grass pickerel (E. americanus vermiculatus), in which the mark curves posteriorly. Its body outline resembles that of the northern pike (E. lucius). Unlike northern pike, however, the opercles and cheeks of chain pickerel are entirely scaled. The average size for chain pickerel, however, is 24 in (61 cm) and 3 lb (1 1/2 kg). (The average chain pickerel caught by fishermen is under 2 lb). It lives around 8 yr. In some places the pickerel is known as a "gunfish", "gunny" or "slime dart", due to its characteristic slime coating.

A blue color morph lacking the usual reticulated pattern has been described in a New York population.

Distribution
Its range is along the eastern coast of North America from southern Canada to Florida, and west to Texas. On the Atlantic Coast,  in  Maine, New Hampshire, New Brunswick, and Nova Scotia although it is considered an invasive species in Nova Scotia, the chain pickerel extend as far as 46°N. The fish inhabits fresh and brackish water from the Mississippi Valley. It also is commonly found in Lake Michigan and the lower portion of the Great Lakes. It is considered invasive in northern areas.

Habitat
Chain pickerel live in a variety of habitats, including pools within creeks or rivers, lakes with vegetation cover, swamps and other wetlands.  Chain pickerel are tolerant of brackish water with salinity levels of up to 22 ppt.  They are also acid tolerant to a pH of 3.8.

Diet

Like the northern pike, the chain pickerel feeds primarily on smaller fish, until it grows large enough to ambush large fish from cover with a rapid lunge and to secure it with its sharp teeth. Chain pickerel are also known to eat frogs, snakes, worms, mice, crayfish, insects, and a wide variety of other foods. It is not unusual for pickerel to leap out of the water at flying insects, or even at dangling fishing lures. Raney (1942) studied chain pickerel in a New York pond and found that golden shiners were found in the stomachs of 47.3% of the 234 chain pickerel examined. Brown bullheads were found in 13.8%, and pumpkinseed sunfish were found in 13.2%. Crayfish of the genus Cambarus were present in 42% of the chain pickerel.

Reproduction
A secondary fall spawning has been reported in Pennsylvania. Fertilization is external and eggs and sperm are mixed by the adults' tail movements. Up to 50,000 eggs may be released by the female. No parental care is provided, and the eggs hatch between six and twelve days after they are laid. The fry possess adhesive glands on their snouts that they use to attach to vegetation. It takes six to eight days for the fry to absorb their yolk sac, at which point they begin to actively hunt.

Angling
The chain pickerel is a popular sport fish. It is an energetic fighter when hooked. Anglers have success with live minnows, spinnerbaits, spoons, topwater lures, plugs, and flies, usually tied with some kind of feather or bucktail material.  If the angler intends to release a fish, it is advisable use pliers to flatten the barbs on the lure's hooks. Chain pickerel can swallow an entire lure, so it will be much easier to free a deeply hooked fish and get it back into the water as soon as possible.

Practically any bass lure can be effective for pickerel, although like most pike, they seem to be particularly susceptible to flashy lures which imitate small forage fish. Dragging a plastic worm, lizard, frog, or other soft imitation can also be extremely effective.  A Texas rig method is recommended with these soft baits for productive fishing in the weeds.

A steel leader is necessary for sharp-toothed and active fish at two to three pounds. The angler would also do well to use 12- to 17-lb-test line on an open-faced spinning reel.  Methods are similar to those for bass, such as dragging a lure through weeds in shallow water and jerking it side-to-side to give it the look of injured prey. Chain pickerel are voracious and opportunistic feeders, and will attack most any fodder that moves into their range of vision.

References

External links

GLANSIS Species FactSheet

Chain pickerel
Fish of the Eastern United States
Fish of the Great Lakes
Fauna of the Northeastern United States
Freshwater fish of the Southeastern United States
Chain pickerel
Chain pickerel
Freshwater fish of North America